Spilarctia sparsalis is a moth in the family Erebidae. It was described by Francis Walker in 1865. It is found on Sulawesi.

References

sparsalis
Moths described in 1865